William Louis "Bill" Culberson (April 5, 1929 in Indianapolis, Indiana – February 8, 2003 in Durham, North Carolina) was an American lichenologist.

Professional history
Culberson earned his bachelor's degree at the University of Cincinnati, where he was influenced by E. Lucy Braun; he subsequently attended the University of Paris and the University of Wisconsin–Madison.

In 1955, Culberson joined the botany department at Duke University; he subsequently managed Duke's acquisition of the lichen-centric herbaria of Julien Harmand and Johan Havaas. He served as the Hugo L. Blomquist Professor. In 2010, the lichen collection was officially named the William Louis & Chicita F. Culberson Lichen Herbarium & Library.

He served as president of the Botanical Society of America and the American Bryological and Lichenological Society and as director of the Sarah P. Duke Gardens. He was the first editor-in-chief of the journal Systematic Botany. In 1992, he became one of the first modern recipients of the Acharius Medal.

In 2000, botanist Theodore Esslinger circumscribed Culbersonia, which is a fungal genus in the family Caliciaceae and named in Bill Culberson and Chicita F. Culberson's honour, his "longtime friends and mentors".

Personal life
In 1953, Dr. Culberson married fellow lichenologist Chicita F. Forman.

See also
 :Category:Taxa named by William Louis Culberson

References

External links
.

American lichenologists
1929 births
2003 deaths
Acharius Medal recipients
Botanical Society of America
Duke University faculty
University of Cincinnati alumni
University of Paris alumni
University of Wisconsin–Madison alumni
Deaths from cancer in North Carolina
People from Indianapolis
20th-century American botanists
21st-century American botanists
American expatriates in France
Fulbright alumni